Fabrício Neis and David Vega Hernández were the defending champions but chose not to defend their title.

Corentin Denolly and Alexandre Müller won the title after defeating Sergio Galdós and Andreas Siljeström 7–5, 6–7(5–7), [10–6] in the final.

Seeds

Draw

References

External links
 Main draw

Internationaux de Tennis de Blois - Doubles
2019 Doubles